Brian Patrick McGahen (3 March 1952 – 3 April 1990) was an Australian gay activist and social libertarian.

He was born at Camperdown in Sydney to hairdresser Patrick James McGahen and Monica Marie Anderson, née Pettit. After attending De La Salle College Ashfield, he received a Bachelor of Social Studies from the University of Sydney in 1974. As a student he opposed the Vietnam War, refusing to register for conscription; his advocacy of draft resistance led to his conviction for sedition. During this time he became a member of the Communist Party of Australia. From 1974 to 1975 he was a social worker and drug counsellor, and he became a founding member of the Australian Social Welfare Union in 1976. Working first on the methadone program with the Health Commission of New South Wales, he also worked for the State Department of Youth and Community Services and in the 1980s reviewed the New South Wales Family Support Services Scheme.

In the mid-1970s, McGahen became involved in the campaign for gay rights as a member of Sydney Gay Liberation and the Socialist Lesbians & Male Homosexuals. He was an organiser for the National Homosexual Conference in 1978 and served as chairman of the Sydney Mardi Gras Association from 1981 to 1984. He stood as the Communist candidate for Lord Mayor of Sydney in 1980 without success. In 1984,  together with fellow Communist Jack Mundey he was elected as an independent to Sydney City Council, serving until the council's dismissal on 26 March 1987. Along with Craig Johnston and Bill Hunt, elected at the same time, he was the first openly gay member of the council.

McGahen became director of a home care service in 1986, and he supported extended care to AIDS sufferers, spousal immigration rights, and a permanent LGBT community centre. He joined the Pride steering committee in 1989 and became treasurer. In 1987 he had been diagnosed with HIV, and chose voluntary euthanasia. He died at Elizabeth Bay on 3 April 1990, and was cremated. In 1992 he was posthumously inducted into the Sydney Gay and Lesbian Mardi Gras Association Hall of Fame.

References

http://www.sydneyaldermen.com.au

1952 births
1990 deaths
Sydney City Councillors
Gay politicians
AIDS-related deaths in Australia
Australian LGBT politicians
20th-century Australian politicians
20th-century Australian LGBT people